The 1976 Sabah state election was held between Monday, 5 April and Saturday, 14 April 1976. This was the third state election to take place, and the first to feature opposition candidates since the first election on 1967, as the second state election on 1971 has all government candidates won uncontested. The state assembly were dissolved on 23 January 1976, and the nomination day was on 18 March 1976.

In the election, BERJAYA Party led by Fuad Stephens, won the election with a majority of 28 seats out of 48 seats in the newly expanded state assembly, and ousted incumbent government United Sabah National Organisation (USNO) from power. USNO, who is in coalition with Sabah Chinese Association (SCA) that governs the state for the past 9 years, only won 20 seats while SCA lost all their seats.

Background and contesting parties
BERJAYA Party was registered only less than a year earlier on July 1975, when some USNO members, dissatisfied with the party's direction under leadership of Mustapha Harun, exits the party and formed BERJAYA. After registered, the party applied, and successfully joined Barisan Nasional. They would be later joined by then Yang di-Pertua Negeri of Sabah, Fuad Stephens, who resigned from his position to lead the new party as its president.

Mustapha himself in October 1975 has resigned from his position of Sabah's Chief Minister, a position he held since USNO won the first state election, though he remains as party leader. His deputy, Said Keruak replaced him and is Chief Minister heading to the 1976 elections. USNO also had convincing wins against BERJAYA candidates in two December 1975 state by-elections, in Kuala Kinabatangan and Labuan.

SCA, which is in Sabah Alliance coalition with USNO and were led by Michael Liaw, also contested in this election. Among other parties contesting is United Sabah People's Party which were led by Richard E. Lee and Joe Manjapi, and also Semenanjung-based Malaysian Social Justice Party (PEKEMAS).

Days before the nomination day, BERJAYA suffered two setbacks, when firstly its secretary-general Mohammad Noor Mansor was detained under Internal Security Act, which made him unable to contest the election. As a result, BERJAYA nominated Mohammad Noor's father to replace him as a candidate. Secondly, Ghani Gilong, then a federal minister, one of the founders of BERJAYA party and its vice president, announced that he will be leaving BERJAYA and returning to USNO, his former party.

At the time of the assembly's dissolution, out of 32 elected and 6 nominated members of the legislative assembly, Sabah Alliance held 34 seats, BERJAYA three seats and an independent held one.

Results

Aftermath

After BERJAYA's win in the election, Fuad were sworn in as the new Chief Minister. But Fuad's tenure would to be short-lived, as he and several of his cabinet ministers died in the helicopter crash on 6 June the same year. Harris Salleh, his deputy, would replace him as Chief Minister.

References

Sabah state elections
Sabah